The Anglia Building Society in the United Kingdom was originally formed by the merger of the Northampton Town and County and Leicestershire building societies in 1966. In 1987, it merged with Nationwide Building Society, becoming Nationwide Anglia Building Society before reverting to the Nationwide name in 1992.

History

Northampton Town and County 
The Northampton Town and County Freehold Land Society was formed in 1848, later becoming Northampton Town and County Benefit Building Society. In 1950, the Wellingborough Town and District Permanent Benefit Building Society transferred engagements and in 1953, it became simply Northampton Town and County Building Society. This Society absorbed a number of other societies.

Leicestershire
The Hinckley and South Leicestershire Permanent Benefit Building Society became Hinckley and Leicestershire Building Society in 1950 and finally Leicestershire Building Society in 1958. This merged with the Northampton Town and County in 1966, to form the Anglia. The new Society, headquartered in Northampton, absorbed a number of other societies.

Hastings and Thanet
In 1978, the Society transferred its engagements to the Hastings and Thanet Building Society, itself formed by the merger of the Hastings Permanent and Isle of Thanet building societies in 1951, becoming for a short time Anglia Hastings and Thanet Building Society.  In 1979, the Grimsby Building Society transferred engagements and in 1980, it once again became known as Anglia Building Society. The London and South of England Building Society transferred engagements in 1983 and the Country (including the engagements of the former Westminster) Building Society transferred in 1984.

In 1987, the Society merged with the Nationwide Building Society, which was formed in London in 1883 and known as the Co-operative Permanent Building Society until 1970. The Nationwide, which traces its dual origins to Northampton, is the largest building society in the world.

See also

Saunders v Anglia Building Society

References

External links
TellyAds

Banks established in 1966
Banks disestablished in 1987
Companies based in Northampton
1966 establishments in England
1987 disestablishments in England
British companies disestablished in 1987
British companies established in 1966